The Metropolitan Collegiate Athletic Conference, popularly known as the Metro Conference, was an NCAA Division I athletics conference, so named because its six charter members were all in urban metropolitan areas, though its later members did not follow that pattern. The conference was centered in the Upper South with some strength in the Deep South. The conference never sponsored football, although most of its members throughout its history had Division I-A football programs (from 1983 to 1991, all Metro schools had independent football programs). In 1995, it merged with the Great Midwest Conference to form Conference USA. The merger was driven mainly by football, as several Metro Conference members had been successfully lured to larger conferences that sponsored the sport.

The conference was popularly known as the "Metro 6" during its first season, then as the "Metro 7" during the rest of the 1970s and early 1980s. For most of its existence, it was considered a "major" conference.

History
The Metro Conference was founded in 1975 with institutions that were located in urban metropolitan areas. The charter members were the University of Cincinnati, Georgia Institute of Technology, the University of Louisville, Memphis State University (now the University of Memphis), Saint Louis University and Tulane University. Florida State University joined in 1976, while the University of South Carolina turned down an invitation in hopes of rejoining the Atlantic Coast Conference.

In 1978, Georgia Tech left the Metro for the Atlantic Coast Conference, effective on July 1, 1979; and Virginia Tech replaced its spot in 1979. In 1982, Saint Louis left to join the Midwestern Collegiate Conference, now known as the Horizon League; while the University of Southern Mississippi replaced its spot in that same year. The University of South Carolina later joined in 1983. In 1985, West Virginia University was in talks to replace Tulane, which had suspended its men’s basketball program due to a points shaving scandal. Ultimately, West Virginia officials decided to remain in the Atlantic 10 Conference.

In 1991, Florida State joined the ACC, and then South Carolina joined the Southeastern Conference. However, South Carolina re-joined the Metro for 1993 and 1994 men's soccer seasons in that sport only, because the SEC did not (and still does not) offer the sport for men (four schools were required to sponsor a sport; the SEC had just three, now two). Charter members Cincinnati and Memphis State also left the Metro in 1991 to become charter members of the Great Midwest. To replace them, three of the stronger non-football schools from the Sun Belt Conference (the University of North Carolina at Charlotte, the University of South Florida and Virginia Commonwealth University) shifted to the Metro.

In 1993, the Metro and Great Midwest conferences began reunification talks that led to the creation of C-USA. However, the Virginia schools filed a lawsuit in order to prevent the merger from happening, which ultimately failed. VCU joined the Colonial Athletic Association. Virginia Tech (which was banking on an invitation to join the Big East Conference) was left out of Conference USA, and joined the Atlantic 10 Conference (it later joined the Big East in 2000 and is now in the Atlantic Coast Conference since 2004). It was joined by Great Midwest member Dayton, which was intrigued by the prospect of playing against regional rival Xavier.

Initially, South Carolina was not permitted to participate in Conference USA for men's soccer, although it was admitted ten years later, also bringing along Kentucky, the only other men's soccer school in the SEC (coincidentally, Tulane was a longtime SEC member from 1932 until 1966).  Until 2021–22 season, South Carolina men's soccer was the last link of the Metro Conference with the reunified Conference USA, although West Virginia, which rejected Metro membership in 1985, was supposed to join Conference USA for men's soccer in 2022 but with the 2021–22 NCAA conference realignment, the Conference USA lost almost all of their men's soccer members, consequently they were forced to drop the sport and South Carolina, Kentucky and West Virginia joined the Sun Belt Conference in men's soccer.

Proposed super conference
The Metro Conference also had studies into a new "Super conference" in 1990. The study was conducted by Raycom Sports. The conference would have included members of the Metro, Atlantic 10, and Big East conferences, but it was not clear if the conference would become a football-sponsoring conference as many of its members did in fact sponsor football but were either independents or belonged to other conferences. The original study plan also included Penn State.

Member schools

Charter members

Notes

Later members

Notes

Membership timeline

Notes:
1. Because the Southeastern Conference does not sponsor men's soccer, South Carolina was an independent from the 1991 to 1992 fall season, then rejoined the Metro for the 1993 and 1994 fall seasons.

Championships
 Metro Conference men's basketball tournament
 Metro Conference baseball tournament

References